Bembix amoena is a species of sand wasp in the family Crabronidae. It is found in North America.

References

External links

 

Crabronidae
Articles created by Qbugbot
Insects described in 1893